André Saraiva ( Monsieur André and Monsieur A) born 2 July 1971. Known mononymously as André, is a Swedish-French artist best known for his work in graffiti. Amongst his creations is Mr. A which he has painted across all six inhabited continents. His work has been featured in museums such as the MoCA as in feature films such as Exit Through the Gift Shop. As an entrepreneur, he owns restaurants, nightclubs such as Le Baron, and hotel chains such as Hotel Amour.

Early life
André Saraiva was born on 2 July  1971 in Uppsala, Sweden, where his Portuguese parents had fled the military regime of Salazar. His mother was a translator and his father was a painter. André moved to Paris at the age of 10, and started graffiti art at the age of thirteen.

Career

Artist

In 1986, André started tagging a top-hatted, stick figure character by the name of Mr. A on the streets of Paris, which earned him a reputation as a renowned graffiti artist. According to André, he has drawn approximately 300,000 Mr. A characters since the inception of his career.

André has been globally recognized for his work with graffiti. In 1989, André Saraiva won a competition organized by the French magazine L'Express. His graffiti spanned  of spray paint and stencils, which was selected among 25 other projects. He was featured on the cover of No. 2001 issue of L'Express. In 1997, he sold his paintings in a shop in Paris, from which he was spotted by Japanese patrons that brought him to the art scene of Tokyo.

André's work has been exhibited in galleries and museums. In 2002, he opened the concept store "BlackBlock" in Paris at Palais de Tokyo; a creation around which he organized concerts, parades and other performances, and whose profits were reinvested in new projects art. In 2010, André appeared in Banksy's documentary Exit Through the Gift Shop. In 2011, he participated in MoCA Los Angeles' Art in the Streets exhibition. The same year, his work was also displayed at the Grand Palais, Paris and the 54th Venice Biennale. In 2014, a solo retrospective dedicated to his work was held at the Museu do Design e da Moda in Lisbon.

Entrepreneur
He has been commissioned to design luxury consumer goods, including goods made by Louis Vuitton, Apple, Chanel, Bally Shoe, Tiffany & Co, Sonia Rykiel, Levi's, Nike, Off-White and Converse. His likeness has been featured in global marketing campaigns.

Besides being a graffiti artist, André has served as the creative director and owner of clubs, hotels and restaurants in Paris, Tokyo, London, Los Angeles, New York City, Shanghai and St. Tropez.

From 2011 to 2015 he was the creative director for L'Officiel, a French fashion magazine.

In April 2020, André unveiled a collaboration with OnePlus, creating customized cases for the OnePlus 8 series.

Conviction for vandalism of Joshua Tree National Park
On 1 April 2015 André was fined for vandalizing a boulder in Joshua Tree National Park, California. André posted photos of the graffiti on Instagram, and the website Modern Hiker and its readers aided the National Park Service in tracking down and identifying André's defacing of the boulder. Before the conviction, André attempted to silence the reporting with legal threats.

Personal life
André was formerly married to French/American electro musician Uffie between 2008 and 2009.

Filmography 
Cazals "Somebody Somewhere (Official Music Video), (2008) directed by André, starring Lou Doillon
The Shoe (2011), directed by André
Deadliest Catch (2012) directed by André
New York La La La (2013) directed by André and Aaron Rose, for L'Officiel Hommes
TV Baby "Wild Joy" (Official Music Video), (2013) directed by André
Last Night at the Chelsea Hotel (2013), directed by André
Rendez-Vous au Club Swan (2015), directed by André Saraiva, featuring Benjamin Millepied and Derek Blasberg

André is also an actor, known for For Lovers Only (2011) and Hora Sagrada (2007).

Further reading

Street Logos, Tristan Manco, Thames & Hudson, 2004, 
GQ 10 essential

References

External links 
lovegraffiti.com
The Hole Gallery
Ekosystem Gallery

1971 births
Living people
French graffiti artists
French people of Portuguese descent
Swedish people of Portuguese descent
People from Uppsala